Ian Timothy Frodsham (22 December 1975 – 2 January 1995) was an English footballer who was at Liverpool. He joined the club as an under-11, from Brookfield School in Kirkby. He signed his professional contract at 17, and played regularly with the Liverpool reserves. He died at age 19 from a spinal tumour.

Liverpool Football Academy's indoor arena is named the Ian Frodsham Indoor Arena, and the club's young player of the year award is named the Ian Frodsham Memorial Award. There is also an Ian Frodsham Tournament and Memorial Cup held at the Academy for school children in the Kirkby area.

References

1975 births
1995 deaths
English footballers
Liverpool F.C. players
Deaths from spinal cancer
Deaths from cancer in England
Neurological disease deaths in England
Association football midfielders